Nithari Village (Baljit Vihar, Delhi), popularly known as Nithari Village (not to be confused by the Nithari Village in Noida). Nithari lies in the Kirari Suleman Nagar Constituency.

Gallery

References 

Villages in North West Delhi district